In a segmented architecture computer, a far pointer is a pointer which includes a segment selector, making it possible to point to addresses outside of the default segment.

Comparison and arithmetic on far pointers is problematic: there can be several different segment-offset address pairs pointing to one  physical address.

In 16-bit x86 

For example, in an Intel 8086, as well as in later processors running 16-bit code, a far pointer has two parts: a 16-bit segment value, and a 16-bit offset value. A linear address is obtained by shifting the binary segment value four times to the left, and then adding the offset value. Hence the effective address is 20 bits (actually 21-bit, which led to the address wraparound and the Gate A20). There can be up to 4096 different segment-offset address pairs pointing to one physical address. To compare two far pointers, they must first be converted (normalized) to their 20-bit linear representation.

On C compilers targeting the 8086 processor family, far pointers were declared using a non-standard far qualifier. For example, char far *p; defined a far pointer to a char. The difficulty of normalizing far pointers could be avoided with the non-standard huge qualifier.

Example of far pointer:
#include <stdio.h>
int main() {
   char far *p =(char far *)0x55550005;
   char far *q =(char far *)0x53332225;
   *p = 80;
   (*p)++;
   printf("%d",*q);
   return 0;
}
Output of the following program: 81; Because both addresses point to same location.
Physical Address = (value of segment register) * 0x10 + (value of offset). 
Location pointed to by pointer 'p' is :  0x5555 * 0x10 + 0x0005 = 0x55555
Location pointed to by pointer 'q' is :  0x5333 * 0x10 + 0x2225 = 0x55555
So, p and q both point to the same location 0x55555.

References

Computer memory